Emotion, in psychology and common use, refers to the complex reaction of an organism to significant objects or events, with subjective, behavioral, physiological elements.

Emotion or Emotions may also refer to:

Psychology 
 Mood (psychology), a relatively long lasting emotional state
 Feeling, the conscious subjective experience of emotion

Publishing 

 Emotion (journal), a scientific journal published by the American Psychological Association
 Emotion Music Co. Ltd, an anime publishing company, subsidiary of Bandai Visual

Music 

 "Emotion" (Samantha Sang song), a 1977 song by the Bee Gees, originally recorded by Samantha Sang and covered by Destiny's Child
 "Emotion" (Helen Reddy song), 1975
 "Emotion", a song by Daft Punk off their 2005 album Human After All
 Emotion (Barbra Streisand album), 1984
 Emotion (Juice Newton album), 1987
 Emotion (Carly Rae Jepsen album), 2015, or the title song
 Emotion (Martina McBride album), 1999
 Emotion (Papa Wemba album), 1995
 Emotion (Samantha Sang album), 1978
 “Emotions” a song by 5 Seconds Of Summer from 5SOS5
 Emotions (Juice Newton album), 1994
 Emotions (Brenda Lee album), 1961
 "Emotions" (Brenda Lee song), 1961
 Emotions (Mariah Carey album), 1991
 "Emotions" (Mariah Carey song), 1991
 Emotions (The Pretty Things album), 1967
 Emotions (Thelma Aoyama album), 2009
 Emotions (Alaska! album), 2003
 "Emotions" (Twista song), 1997
 "Emotions", a song recorded by Jennifer Lopez for her eighth studio album, A.K.A., 2014
 "Emotions", a song by Love from their self-titled debut album, 1966
 "Emotions", a song by Ella Henderson for her second studio album Everything I Didn't Say, 2022
 The Emotions, a female vocal group
 The Emotions (doo-wop group), an American doo-wop vocal group

Other uses 
 Emotion, a 1966 Japanese short film directed by Nobuhiko Obayashi
 Emotion Production, media company from Serbia
 Fisker EMotion, an electric concept car
 One of the many brand names for the drug lorazepam

See also
 Emo (slang), slang for emotional